Olgiate Comasco is a comune (municipality) in the Province of Como in the Italian region Lombardy, located about  northwest of Milan and about  southwest of Como. It received the honorary title of city with a presidential decree in 1998.

Olgiate borders the following municipalities: Albiolo, Beregazzo con Figliaro, Colverde, Faloppio, Lurate Caccivio, Oltrona di San Mamette, Solbiate, Somaino

Main sights 
There are three churches in Olgiate Comasco, 
 St. Ippolito e Cassiano, sited in the downtown
 St. Gerardo 
 Annunziata, in the frazione Somaino.

Twin towns
 Liancourt, France
 [Pesterzsébet], Budapest, Hungary
 San Cataldo, Italy

References

Cities and towns in Lombardy